Markus Martin Neumayr (born 26 March 1986) is a German professional footballer who plays as an attacking midfielder for FC Linth 04.

Club career
Born in Hösbach, Neumayr started his football career playing for local clubs before moving to Eintracht Frankfurt in 2003 However, within a few months, he was picked up by Manchester United. During his spell with Manchester United, he played on the right side of midfield, although on some occasions he would play in the middle of the park.

In the three seasons Neumayr spent at Old Trafford, he never played in a match for the first team. He was once called into the squad on 29 March 2006 for the match against West Ham United but did not make the final sixteen. When David Fox departed to Blackpool, Neumayr took on the role of reserve team captain. With this added responsibility, many believed it would only be a matter of time before he would go on and make the first team. However, this never materialised, and Neumayr was released from the club at his own request at the end of the 2005–06 season, joining MSV Duisburg. After a year with SV Zulte Waregem he signed in summer 2009 for Rot-Weiss Essen.

On 20 June 2008, Neumayr signed a deal at Belgian First Division club Zulte Waregem. His contract at Duisburg was not renewed, and so he was able to join Zulte Waregem on a free transfer. In January 2009, he returned to Germany, signing for RW Essen. In April 2010 he announced his transfer to Wacker Burghausen for the 2010–11 season., before joining FC Thun the following January. Neumayr joined AC Bellinzona (Swiss Challenge League) in June 2011.

In January 2016, he signed a one-and-a-half-year contract with FC Luzern. Neumayr became a Swiss citizen in March 2017.

On 31 July 2018, Neumayr signed for Persian Gulf Pro League club Esteghlal on a two-year contract. On 16 December, Neumayr was released by Esteghlal along with Alhaji Gero, after both players failed to perform well.

On 31 December 2018, Neumayr joined the Swiss side Aarau.

International career
Neumayr was born in Germany and was a former youth international for Germany. He left Germany at the age of 16, and in 2011 moved to Switzerland. He has gained Swiss citizenship, and has a Swiss wife and children. He is open to representing the Switzerland national team.

Honours
Vaduz
 Swiss Challenge League: 2013–14
 Liechtensteiner Cup: 2013–14, 2014–15

References

External links

 
 DFB Profile

1986 births
Living people
People from Aschaffenburg
Sportspeople from Lower Franconia
German footballers
Germany youth international footballers
Swiss men's footballers
German emigrants to Switzerland
Association football midfielders
German expatriate footballers
Swiss expatriate footballers
Footballers from Bavaria
Bundesliga players
2. Bundesliga players
3. Liga players
Swiss Super League players
Swiss Challenge League players
Süper Lig players
Eintracht Frankfurt players
Manchester United F.C. players
MSV Duisburg players
S.V. Zulte Waregem players
Rot-Weiss Essen players
Viktoria Aschaffenburg players
SV Wacker Burghausen players
FC Thun players
AC Bellinzona players
FC Vaduz players
German expatriate sportspeople in Liechtenstein
FC Luzern players
Kasımpaşa S.K. footballers
Esteghlal F.C. players
FC Aarau players
Expatriate footballers in England
Expatriate footballers in Switzerland
Expatriate footballers in Liechtenstein
Expatriate footballers in Turkey
Expatriate footballers in Iran